Coleophora ditella is a moth of the family Coleophoridae. It is found from Germany to the Iberian Peninsula, Italy and Bulgaria.

The larvae feed on Achillea millefolium, Artemisia alba, Artemisia campestris, Artemisia maritima, Artemisia vulgaris, Aster linosyris, Helichrysum and Tanacetum cinerariifolium. They create a tubular, two-valved, black sheath case, somewhat narrowed behind the mouth. The rear end is narrowed and flattened. The mouth angle is about 20°. Larvae can be found from September to June.

References

ditella
Moths described in 1849
Moths of Europe